is a 2002 Japanese movie directed by Fukutani Osamu.

External links
   
 
 

2002 films
2000s Japanese-language films
2000s Japanese films